The WePlay Academy League is a series of Counter-Strike: Global Offensive (CS:GO) tournaments. The WePlay Academy League was introduced in 2021 and held by WePlay Holding (CEO – Oleh Humeniuk), also known for such events as the WePlay Bukovel Minor 2020, WePlay Dragon Temple, OMEGA League, and WePlay AniMajor. The main goal of the tournament is to establish standards for the CS:GO discipline to nurture new talents.

History

The esports league is supported by leading CS:GO organizations, including Natus Vincere, Astralis, Ninjas in Pajamas, MOUZ, Virtus.pro, Fnatic, and others. Eight teams took part in each of the seasons.

WePlay Holding streams all games in English and Russian. Besides, the Playoff Stage takes place offline at the WePlay Esports Arena Kyiv to provide young players with a real onstage experience.

Season 1 had a peak of 28,429 and Season 2 had a peak of 20,463 concurrent viewers, according to Esports Charts.

Format 
Teams consist of at least four players between the ages of 16 and 20. One player aged over 20 years old may participate in each team.

The WePlay Academy League Season 1 began with a round-robin online Group Stage. After the Group Stage, the top three teams advanced to the Playoffs, and the eighth-placed team was eliminated. The rest of the teams kept competing in the Gauntlet Stage for the last slot in the Playoffs. The total prize pool of the WePlay Academy League Season 1 was $100,000.

The WePlay Academy League Season 2 started with the Group Stage. All the teams were divided into two GSL groups. The top team from each group proceeded to the Playoffs with a double-elimination bracket, while the lowest-ranking team in both groups got eliminated from the competition until next season. The rest of the teams competed for the two remaining spots in the Playoffs in the extra rounds. The Playoff Stage was held offline at the WePlay Esports Arena Kyiv. The total prize pool of the second season was $100,000.

Standards

The WePlay Academy League mirrors esports events of the Tier-1 scene, therefore, it's a good starting point for an esports career According to Eugene Shepelev, lead esports manager at WePlay Holding, “[WePlay Academy League]’s a space for young players to get some experience and to develop and show themselves internationally. To get used to playing on LAN, take interviews and photoshoots, and everything that comes with it”.

NAVI Junior player Ilya “m0NESY” Osipov captured headlines after showcasing his abilities at the WePlay Academy League Season 2 Finals and scoring a 1.30 HLTV rating.
Even Oleksandr “S1mple” Kostyliev didn't stand aside and gave advice to m0NESY: “He [m0NESY] needs more experience against the best teams. In his place, I would go somewhere for a year and see what happens” m0NESY expressed his intention to perform at a higher level after the LAN finals of the WePlay Academy League.

The organizers are going to hold at least six seasons.

Besides, the WePlay Academy League uses different tools to combat the stigma attached to esports. Using BPM sensors, the tournament operator made the tension the players experienced evident to spectators. As the game progressed, the heart rate of some players reached over 100 bpm and 130 bpm during tense moments Plus, the heart rate monitors unequivocally demonstrated the need for good motor skills and stress-coping strategies.

References

External links
 Official website

Counter-Strike competitions
Recurring sporting events established in 2021